Kendallville is a city in Wayne Township, Noble County, in the U.S. state of Indiana. The population was 10,205 at the 2021 census.

History
Kendallville was laid out in 1849. The city was named for Amos Kendall, 8th United States Postmaster General.

A post office has been in operation at Kendallville since 1837.

The Iddings-Gilbert-Leader-Anderson Block and Kendallville Downtown Historic District are listed on the National Register of Historic Places.

Geography

Demographics

2010 census
As of the census of 2010, there were 9,862 people, 3,940 households, and 2,483 families living in the city. The racial makeup of the city was 94.1% White, 0.5% African American, 0.2% Native American, 0.5% Asian, 2.9% from other races, and 1.8% from two or more races. Hispanic or Latino of any race were 5.1% of the population.

There were 3,940 households, of which 36.1% had children under the age of 18 living with them, 42.2% were married couples living together, 14.4% had a female householder with no husband present, 6.4% had a male householder with no wife present, and 37.0% were non-families. 31.1% of all households were made up of individuals, and 11.9% had someone living alone who was 65 years of age or older. The average household size was 2.46 and the average family size was 3.06.

The median age in the city was 34.6 years. 27.4% of residents were under the age of 18; 8.9% were between the ages of 18 and 24; 27.3% were from 25 to 44; 23.5% were from 45 to 64; and 12.9% were 65 years of age or older. The gender makeup of the city was 48.2% male and 51.8% female.

2000 census
As of the census of 2000, there were 9,616 people, 3,873 households, and 2,459 families living in the city. The racial makeup of the city was 96.66% White, 0.25% African American, 0.16% Native American, 0.59% Asian, 0.01% Pacific Islander, 1.37% from other races, and 0.96% from two or more races. Hispanic or Latino of any race were 3.16% of the population.

There were 3,873 households, out of which 35.9% had children under the age of 18 living with them, 46.0% were married couples living together, 13.3% had a female householder with no husband present, and 36.5% were non-families. 31.5% of all households were made up of individuals, and 12.7% had someone living alone who was 65 years of age or older. The average household size was 2.44 and the average family size was 3.07.

In the city, the population was spread out, with 28.0% under the age of 18, 10.3% from 18 to 24, 30.1% from 25 to 44, 17.7% from 45 to 64, and 13.8% who were 65 years of age or older. The median age was 32 years. For every 100 females, there were 89.1 males. For every 100 females age 18 and over, there were 86.2 males.

The median income for a household in the city was $33,899, and the median income for a family was $42,341. Males had a median income of $33,258 versus $23,851 for females. The per capita income for the city was $16,335. About 7.9% of families and 9.9% of the population were below the poverty line, including 10.7% of those under age 18 and 8.6% of those age 65 or over.

Annual cultural events
 Apple Festival
 Christmas Parade
 County Fair
 Fireworks at Bixler Lake (4 July)
 Kendallville Main Street Car Show
 The Kendallville Open
 Tri-State Bluegrass Festival

Education
Schools in the Kendallville area include:
 East Noble High School
 East Noble Middle School
 South Side Elementary School
 North Side Elementary School
 Wayne Center Elementary School
 St. John Lutheran School

The town has a lending library, the Kendallville Public Library.

Media 
The News Sun is the city's daily newspaper; and it also covers the rest of Noble and LaGrange counties. It is the successor of the Noble County Journal, a weekly founded , and is now owned by KPC Media Group, a chain of three dailies, three weeklies, and several monthly publications in northeastern Indiana. It has its headquarters on Main Street in Kendallville.

The Kendallville Mall newspaper and KendallvilleTV on YouTube provide local news and videos.

Notable people
 Arthur Mapes, poet, born and raised in Kendallville, wrote Indiana's state poem and recognized in 1977 as the Poet Laureate for Indiana.
 David M. McIntosh, member of the U.S. House of Representatives from 1995 to 2001; Republican nominee for governor of Indiana in 2000
 Brad Miller, two-time NBA All-Star, Center; 2003 - Indiana Pacers, 2004 - Sacramento Kings, retired in 2012.
 George A. Mitchell, founder of Cadillac, Michigan
 William Mitchell, United States Representative from Indiana
 Alvin M. Strauss, architect, born to German immigrant parents in Kendallville, best known for Lincoln Bank Tower
 Amy Yoder Begley, middle- and long-distance runner, competed at the 2008 Summer Olympics

References

External links
 
 

Cities in Indiana
Micropolitan areas of Indiana
Cities in Noble County, Indiana